Mazkeret Moshe is a former courtyard neighborhood in Jerusalem. Today it is part of the Nachlaot neighborhood.

Mazkeret Moshe was founded in 1882 from the ardent financial support of British Jewish financier and banker, Moses Montefiore. The name "Mazkeret Moshe" means "memorial to Moses."  The neighborhood was intended for Ashkenazi Jews, while the adjacent neighborhood Ohel Moshe, also funded by Montefiore's foundation, was intended for Sephardi Jews.

The Wiener Heritage Center, an archive of historic photographs, is located in Mazkeret Moshe.

Hessed Verahamim synagogue is a Sephardi synagogue in Mazkeret Moshe that was once a pub. In the late 1920s, the neighborhood butcher convinced the pub owner to turn the building into a synagogue. The doors are covered with silver plates illustrating the Twelve Tribes.

See also
Architecture in Israel
History of Jerusalem

References

Nachlaot
1882 establishments in Ottoman Syria